Willowbrook Cemetery is located at 395 Main Street in Westport, Connecticut.  Established in 1847, the cemetery is located close to Westport's downtown area, and features the burials of many members of Westport's historic families, including the Coley, Burr, Nash, Bedford, Bradley and Hurlbutt families.

Notable interments
Notable interments here include:
 E.T. Bedford, executive of Standard Oil
 Edward H. Coley, bishop of the Episcopal Diocese of Central New York
 Peter De Vries, editor and novelist
 James Earle Fraser, sculptor, and his wife Laura Gardin Fraser, sculptor
 Harold Jacoby, astronomer
 Morris Ketchum, financier
 Alexander Kipnis, Ukrainian-born operatic bass singer
 Lawrence Langner, playwright, author, and producer
 Lars-Eric Lindblad, entrepreneur and tourism explorer
 Vivian Perlis, musicologist
 Fritz Reiner, conductor
 Frederick M. Salmon, politician
 Alexander McCormick Sturm, co-founder of American firearm maker Sturm, Ruger & Co.
 Mort Walker, cartoonist
 John B. Watson, a psychologist who established the psychological school of behaviorism
 George Hand Wright, artist

References

External links
  
 
 

Westport, Connecticut
Cemeteries in Fairfield County, Connecticut
Frederick Law Olmsted works
1847 establishments in Connecticut